Wysong is a surname. Notable people with the name include:
Biff Wysong (1905–51), American professional baseball pitcher
David Wysong  (born 1949), American politician
Dudley Wysong (1939–98), American professional golfer
James Wysong, American flight attendant who has written some books